Jurová is a village and municipality in the Dunajská Streda District in the Trnava Region of south-west Slovakia.

Geography
The municipality lies at an altitude of 126 metres and covers an area of 10.735 km². It has a population of about 433 people.

History
In the 9th century, the territory of Gabčíkovo became part of the Great Moravia. In historical records the village was first mentioned in 1253. Until the end of World War I, it was part of Hungary and fell within the Dunaszerdahely district of Pozsony County. After the Austro-Hungarian army disintegrated in November 1918, Czechoslovakian troops occupied the area. After the Treaty of Trianon of 1920, the village became officially part of Czechoslovakia. In November 1938, the First Vienna Award granted the area to Hungary and it was held by Hungary until 1945. After Soviet occupation in 1945, Czechoslovakian administration returned and the village became officially part of Czechoslovakia in 1947.

Demography 
At the 2001 Census the recorded population of the village was 442 while an end-2008 estimate by the Statistical Office had the villages's population as 462. As of 2001, 94.12% of its population was Hungarians and 5.20% Slovaks. Roman Catholicism is the majority religion of the village, its adherents numbering 96.80% of the total population.

Twin towns
  Andocs, Hungary

See also
 List of municipalities and towns in Slovakia

References

Genealogical resources

The records for genealogical research are available at the state archive "Statny Archiv in Bratislava, Slovakia"
 Roman Catholic church records (births/marriages/deaths): 1728-1912 (parish A)
 Lutheran church records (births/marriages/deaths): 1823-1946 (parish B)

External links
Surnames of living people in Jurova

Villages and municipalities in Dunajská Streda District
Hungarian communities in Slovakia